Tossaporn Chuchin (born 2 February 1993) is a Thai professional footballer who plays for Chiangmai United in Thai League 1 as a  right-back.

References

External links
 

1993 births
Living people
Tossaporn Chuchin
Association football defenders
Tossaporn Chuchin
Tossaporn Chuchin
Tossaporn Chuchin